Seo Jong-ho (born 20 June 1980) is a South Korean former field hockey player who competed in the 2000 Summer Olympics, the 2004 Summer Olympics, the 2008 Summer Olympics and the 2012 Summer Olympics.

References

External links

1980 births
Living people
South Korean male field hockey players
Olympic field hockey players of South Korea
Field hockey players at the 2000 Summer Olympics
Field hockey players at the 2004 Summer Olympics
Field hockey players at the 2008 Summer Olympics
Olympic silver medalists for South Korea
Olympic medalists in field hockey
2002 Men's Hockey World Cup players
2006 Men's Hockey World Cup players
2010 Men's Hockey World Cup players
Field hockey players at the 2012 Summer Olympics
Asian Games medalists in field hockey
Field hockey players at the 2002 Asian Games
Field hockey players at the 2006 Asian Games
Field hockey players at the 2010 Asian Games
Medalists at the 2000 Summer Olympics
Asian Games gold medalists for South Korea
Medalists at the 2002 Asian Games
Medalists at the 2006 Asian Games